Christopher Michael Pratt (born June 21, 1979) is an American actor. He rose to prominence for playing Andy Dwyer in the NBC sitcom Parks and Recreation (2009–2015). He also appeared in The WB drama series Everwood (2002–2006) and had supporting roles in the films Wanted (2008), Jennifer's Body (2009), Moneyball (2011), Zero Dark Thirty (2012), and Her (2013).

Pratt established himself as a Hollywood leading man by starring in two lucrative film series. Since 2014, he has played Star-Lord in the Marvel Cinematic Universe, beginning with Guardians of the Galaxy and most recently appearing in the Disney+ special The Guardians of the Galaxy Holiday Special (2022). He has also starred as Owen Grady in the Jurassic World trilogy (2015–2022), part of the Jurassic Park franchise.

Pratt's other starring roles were in The Magnificent Seven (2016), Passengers (2016), and The Tomorrow War (2021), and the action thriller television series The Terminal List (2022). In 2015, Time magazine named him one of the 100 most influential people in the world.

Early life
Christopher Michael Pratt was born on June 21, 1979, in Virginia, Minnesota. His mother worked at a Safeway supermarket, and his father worked in mining and later remodeling houses. Pratt's father died in 2014 from multiple sclerosis. His mother is of Norwegian descent. When Pratt was seven years old, the family moved to Lake Stevens, Washington. Pratt placed fifth in a high school state wrestling tournament. He also was a shot putter for his high school's track team. He later recalled that when his wrestling coach asked him what he wished to do with his life, he said I don't know, but I know I'll be famous and I know I'll make a shit ton of money.' I had no idea how. I'd done nothing proactive." He graduated from Lake Stevens High School in 1997.

Pratt dropped out of community college halfway through the first semester and, after working as a discount ticket salesman and daytime stripper, he ended up homeless in Maui, Hawaii, sleeping in a van and a tent on the beach. He told The Independent, "It's a pretty awesome place to be homeless. We just drank and smoked weed and worked minimal hours, just enough to cover gas, food, and fishing supplies." He recalled listening to the Dr. Dre album 2001 daily, to the point where he knew every lyric; years later, he rapped Eminem's verses from the song "Forgot About Dre" extemporaneously during an interview. During his time in Maui, he worked for Christian missionary organization Jews for Jesus.

Career

2000–2013: Early work and breakthrough
When Pratt was age 19, he waited tables at the Bubba Gump Shrimp Company restaurant in Maui when he was discovered by actress and director Rae Dawn Chong. She cast him in her directorial debut, the short horror film Cursed Part 3, which was filmed in Los Angeles. Pratt's first regular television role was as Harold Brighton "Bright" Abbott on the series Everwood. After Everwood cancellation, he joined the cast of The O.C. for its fourth season, playing activist Winchester "Ché" Cook. He also had an appearance in the 2008 action film Wanted, where James McAvoy hits him with a keyboard.

In 2009, Pratt began playing Andy Dwyer on the NBC comedy series Parks and Recreation. Originally meant to be a temporary character, producers liked Pratt so much they asked him to become a series regular. This proved to be his breakthrough role.

Pratt portrayed Oakland Athletics first baseman/catcher Scott Hatteberg in the 2011 film Moneyball. He was initially told that he was too fat to play Hatteberg, as he had gained , which Pratt attributed to the cooking of his then-girlfriend, actress Anna Faris. When he felt he had lost enough, he sent a photo of himself to the casting director and won the part. Before the release of Moneyball, Pratt was typecast as youthful and somewhat immature characters. In Moneyball, he played a dramatic role as a father and dejected baseball player who once feared his career was over and who had the difficult task of learning a new defensive position.

He gained back the weight he had lost to appear in the film 10 Years (2011), then lost it again to portray a Navy SEAL in the film Zero Dark Thirty (2012). He played the co-worker of Joaquin Phoenix character in Spike Jonze's sci-fi romance Her in December 2013.

2014–present: Franchise work and worldwide recognition
While Pratt had been known to this point for playing supporting characters and he was best known for his portly character on Parks and Recreation, 2014 marked a turning point in his career when he headlined two major studio films: Emmet Brickowski in The Lego Movie, which grossed $469.1 million; and Peter Quill / Star-Lord in Marvel Studios' Guardians of the Galaxy, which grossed $773.3 million. Pratt had initially turned down the role of Peter Quill, explaining he did not "want another Captain Kirk or Avatar moment" (after humbling auditions for both). The film's casting director, Sarah Finn, suggested Pratt to the director James Gunn, who had struggled to cast that role and dismissed the idea. In spite of this, Finn arranged for a meeting between the two, at which point Gunn was convinced that Pratt was perfect for the role. Pratt also won over Marvel Studios President Kevin Feige, despite having gained weight again for the comedy film Delivery Man. The role was part of a multi-film deal that Pratt signed with Marvel. Bruce Diones of The New Yorker noted, "Pratt, overflowing with charisma, plays the leader of the pack of misfits, and his blissed-out space cowboy (with a love for seventies music) is so full of good will that he buoys the film and its requisite whizbang special effects."

In November 2013, Pratt, an avid fan of Jurassic Park (1993) who has referred to the film as "my Star Wars", replaced Josh Brolin as the lead in Jurassic World (2015). He played Owen Grady, who works training Velociraptors. Jurassic World grossed $652.3 million in North America and $1.018 billion overseas for a worldwide total of $1.670 billion. His performance was praised, with Peter Travers of Rolling Stone stating that Pratt "ace[d] it as an action hero and invests his sexual banter with a comic flair the movie could have used more of." He reprised the role in the sequel, Jurassic World: Fallen Kingdom, which was released on June 22, 2018. Although a commercial success, the sequel received mixed reviews, with Brian Lowry of CNN criticizing the film for "largely neutralizing [...] Pratt's charm and comedic skills."

His next film role was as Josh Faraday, a gambler, in The Magnificent Seven, a remake of the 1960 Western with the same name, in which he starred alongside Denzel Washington. The film was released on September 23, 2016. Pratt's second 2016 release was Passengers, a science fiction film which opened in December, co-starring Jennifer Lawrence. Pratt played Jim Preston, "a mechanic, who wants to get off an Earth that no longer seems to value a guy who works with his hands".

Pratt reprised his role as Peter Quill / Star-Lord in the Guardians of the Galaxy sequel Guardians of the Galaxy Vol. 2, which was released in May 2017. The film focuses on Quill's and his team's search for his father. Pratt also reprised the character in Avengers: Infinity War, which was released in April 2018, and in Avengers: Endgame, which was released on April 26, 2019.

Additionally, Pratt reprised the voice role of Emmet in The Lego Movie 2: The Second Part along with another character Rex Dangervest. In August 2017, Pratt was confirmed to star in the western drama The Kid. He is also set to appear as Duncan in the action film Cowboy Ninja Viking alongside Priyanka Chopra. Initially the movie was decided to be released in June 2019, however, on August 7, 2018, the film was pulled from the release list, nullifying the previous release date. In March 2020, Pratt had a lead voice role in the Disney/Pixar animated feature film Onward, alongside his Avengers co-star Tom Holland.

In May 2021, Pratt and Parks and Recreation announced the upcoming release of a new album based on Pratt's character Andy Dwyer. In June 2021, they officially released a pair of singles, "The Pit" and "Two Birds Holding Hands". The album, which is called Mouse Rat: The Awesome Album, was released in August 2021. In September 2021, it was announced that Pratt would be voicing the Nintendo mascot Mario in The Super Mario Bros. Movie based on the video game series of the same name. In November 2021, it was announced that he would be voicing the titular cat of the upcoming animated film Garfield, being directed by Mark Dindal from a script by David Reynolds. In June 2022, he was announced to star in The Electric State alongside Millie Bobby Brown.

Public image
In March 2014, Pratt was awarded the CinemaCon Award for Breakthrough Performer. In 2014, he was ranked at number two on People magazine's annual list of Sexiest Men Alive. Pratt poked fun at his fluctuating physique in a musical number he performed during his monologue when he hosted the September 27, 2014 episode of Saturday Night Live. On April 21, 2017, Pratt received a star on the Hollywood Walk of Fame for his contributions to the motion picture industry, located at 6834 Hollywood Boulevard.

Personal life

In 2007, on the set of Take Me Home Tonight, Pratt met actress Anna Faris, who played his love interest in the film. They were engaged in late 2008 and married in Bali, Indonesia, on July 9, 2009, eloping on a whim after a friend's wedding. They lived in the Hollywood Hills neighborhood of Los Angeles. Their son was born in 2012, nine weeks premature and weighing only . Pratt stated that the birth of his preterm son "really defined" his faith in God, after both he and his wife "prayed a lot" as they were initially afraid of the baby's prognosis. The couple split in 2017 and finalized their divorce the following year.

Pratt began a relationship with author Katherine Schwarzenegger in June 2018. On January 13, 2019, Pratt announced that he and Schwarzenegger were engaged. They were married on June 8, 2019, in Montecito, California. In 2020 their first child was born. Through his marriage to Schwarzenegger, he is a member of the Kennedy family. In May 2022, their second daughter was born.

Pratt was raised Lutheran and later worked for Jews for Jesus, eventually becoming a non-denominational Christian. Pratt reportedly attends the Zoe Church in Los Angeles, which is affiliated with the Hillsong Church and has been criticized by some as anti-LGBTQ. He responded by saying, "It has recently been suggested that I belong to a church which 'hates a certain group of people' and is 'infamously anti-LGBTQ.' Nothing could be further from the truth. I go to a church that opens its doors to absolutely everyone." Brian Houston of Hillsong has denied that Pratt was ever a member of his church. Guardians of the Galaxy director James Gunn also defended Pratt, stating that he "know[s] the church he currently goes to" and scolded those wishing to have him recast as Star-Lord.

Pratt referenced the controversy in a 2022 Men's Health interview while discussing his acceptance for MTV's Generation Award, in which speech he emphasizes to youth that God loves them. "Maybe it was hubris. For me to stand up on the stage and say the things that I said, I'm not sure I touched anybody... Religion has been oppressive as fuck for a long time... I didn't know that I would kind of become the face of religion when really I'm not a religious person. I think there’s a distinction between being religious—adhering to the customs created by man, oftentimes appropriating the awe reserved for who I believe is a very real God—and using it to control people, to take money from people, to abuse children, to steal land, to justify hatred. Whatever it is. The evil that’s in the heart of every single man has glommed on to the back of religion and come along for the ride." He added that he still had a strong belief in God but was never a member of Hillsong, having chosen not to denounce them at the time so as not to "throw a church under the bus".

Politically, Pratt has stated he does not feel represented by either side of the political spectrum and has expressed a desire to find common ground. He donated over $1,000 to Barack Obama's 2012 campaign.

Philanthropy
In 2015, Pratt and Anna Faris donated $1 million to a charity which provided eyeglasses to underprivileged children. The donation was allegedly inspired by Pratt's son who was born premature and visually impaired. They also donated to neonatal intensive care unit of the Cedars-Sinai Medical Center in Los Angeles and also supported March of Dimes which works to end premature births, birth defects and infant mortality.

In December 2016, Pratt donated $500,000 to a teen center in his hometown of Lake Stevens. The teen center was named in memory of his father.

In February 2021, Pratt donated $20,000 to fight hunger in South Carolina. The donation was part of a fundraiser by Pratt and an organization to raise $650,000 in order to fight food insecurity amidst the COVID-19 pandemic in the United States. Pratt also helped create the charity Feed Thy Neighbor to which he donated $100,000. Also in February 2021, he donated $10,000 to the Edmonds Food Bank as part of his organization and also donated to the Edmonds Chamber of Commerce and Edmonds Waterfront Center in Washington state.

Filmography

Film

Television

Video games

Theme park attractions

Awards and nominations

References

External links

 
 

1979 births
20th-century Christians
21st-century American male actors
21st-century Christians
American Christians
American male film actors
American male television actors
American male voice actors
American people of Norwegian descent
Kennedy family
Living people
Male actors from Minnesota
Male actors from Washington (state)
People from Lake Stevens, Washington
People from Virginia, Minnesota
Schwarzenegger family
Shorty Award winners